Rabbi Avruhum Yitzchok Ulman (also Ullman) is a senior Haredi rabbi living in Jerusalem.

Biography 

He was born in Hungary and immigrated to Israel as a child. He serves on the Beis Din (court of Jewish law), also known as the Badatz, of the Edah HaChareidis, Jerusalem's council of Haredi communities. He also presides over his own Beis Din, which deals mainly with financial matters. He is known as an expert in Choshen Mishpat (Jewish law on financial/property law matters). He is a respected Haredi leader, often officiating at public gatherings of Haredi Jews in Jerusalem.

Rabbi Ulman is a member of the Dushinsky Hasidic movement. He was the closest talmid ("disciple") of the previous rebbe of Dushinsky, Rabbi Yisroel Moshe Dushinsky, and was present when the latter died, leading the massive prayer and funeral services that followed. In festive gatherings in Dushinsky, he usually sits next to the Rebbe.

He has endorsed and signed numerous declarations and works against Zionism in general and against the practices of the state of Israel.

He lives in the Jerusalem neighborhood of Givat Shaul, where he is the rabbi of the largest synagogue of the neighborhood, called Ner Yisroel, more commonly known as "Zupnik", and of the section of the neighborhood surrounding it. Rabbi Ulman became leader of the community upon its foundation, about 30 years ago.

Ulman was one of the main speakers at a major protest rally against the growing influence of nationalistic (Zionist) thought and philosophies in the Haredi world, held on Sunday, 24 February 2008 in Yeshivas Meah Shearim.

External links
 Google Videos: Rabbi Ulman dancing with the father of the groom and the groom himself at a wedding

References 

Living people
Anti-Zionist Hasidic rabbis
Year of birth missing (living people)
Rabbis of the Edah HaChareidis
Ponevezh Yeshiva alumni
Hungarian emigrants to Israel
Hungarian Hasidic rabbis
Israeli Hasidic rabbis
Rabbis in Jerusalem